Onurhan Babuscu (born 5 September 2003) is an Austrian professional footballer who plays as a midfielder for Turkish club Gaziantep.

Club career
On 16 August 2022, Babuscu signed a four-year contract with Gaziantep in Turkey.

International career
Born in Austria, Babuscu is of Turkish descent. He is a youth international for Austria.

Career statistics

Club

References

2003 births
Austrian people of Turkish descent
Sportspeople from Baden bei Wien
Footballers from Lower Austria
Living people
Austrian footballers
Austria youth international footballers
Association football midfielders
Austrian Regionalliga players
Austrian Football Bundesliga players
FC Admira Wacker Mödling players
Gaziantep F.K. footballers
Austrian expatriate footballers
Expatriate footballers in Turkey
Austrian expatriate sportspeople in Turkey